Poor Millionaires may refer to:

 Poor Millionaires (1936 film), Swedish film
 Poor Millionaires (1957 film), Mexican film